Stoke-on-Trent is a city located in Staffordshire, England. The city is a linear conurbation of six constituent towns (Burslem, Fenton, Longton, Tunstall, Stoke-upon-Trent and Hanley, with the latter being regarded as the city centre). Stoke-on-Trent is considered to be the home of the pottery industry in England and is commonly known as the Potteries. Formerly a primarily industrial conurbation, it is now a centre for service industries and distribution centres.
 
There are over 20,000 Grade II* listed buildings in England and this page is a list of these buildings in the city of Stoke-on-Trent. There are sixteen buildings or structures that have been listed by the Secretary of State for Culture, Olympics, Media and Sport as Grade II*, which signifies "particularly important buildings of more than special interest".

In the United Kingdom, the term "listed building" refers to a building or other structure officially designated as being of special architectural, historical or cultural significance. These buildings are in three grades: Grade I consists of buildings of outstanding architectural or historical interest; Grade II* includes particularly significant buildings of more than local interest. Buildings in England are listed on recommendations provided by English Heritage, which also determines the grading.

Listed buildings and structures

|}

Notes

External links

 
Lists of Grade II* listed buildings in Staffordshire
Buildings and structures in Stoke-on-Trent